Figges Marsh is a 25-acre public park in the London Borough of Merton. It is in Mitcham, close to Tooting railway station.

Originally, the park was next to a toll road into London, which was turnpiked in 1745; now known as London Road.

The Name
The park was named after William Figge who occupied the land from 1357. In maps of 1750, it is referenced as Piggs Marsh; in 1800, as Pigs Marsh Common [see External Source, The Underground Map, for map extracts].

Signage, erected in 2012, at the southern end, recognises that Figges Marsh is protected in perpetuity as a Fields in Trust Queen Elizabeth II Field. This was in celebration of HM Queen Elizabeth II's Diamond Jubilee & the 2012 London Olympics. The parks that participated in the scheme received a commemorative plaque, an oak sapling &, potentially, access to an improvement grant.

Surrounding Area
At the eastern boundary of Figges Marsh, during the medieval period, was the Biggin Farm estate.

Industry developed at the southern end of the park from 1800. The Pascall's confectionery factory was located here in 1888, built on land purchased from James Bridger's Manor Farm, taking advantage of the locally grown peppermint oil.

However, the area to the east and west remained agricultural and open; Swain's & Tamworth farm, at the western boundary of Figges Marsh, are made reference to in the 1900 map [The Underground Map, as below]. That is, until the development of housing in the Victorian & Edwardian period.

References

External Sources
 The Underground Map.com – historical map of Figges Marsh from 1900
 Wikipedia, Toll Roads in Great Britain - summary of toll roads/turnpikes, in Great Britain
 Figges Marsh photograph from 1950s

Photo gallery 

Parks and open spaces in the London Borough of Merton